Jan Šťastný (c.1764 – c.1830) was a Czech composer.

Jan Šťastný may also refer to:
Jan Šťastný (actor) (born 1965), Czech actor
Jan Šťastný (canoeist) (born 1970), Czech canoeist
Ján Šťastný (hockey player) (born 1982), Slovak hockey player

See also
Ján
Jan (name)
Jan (disambiguation)
Šťastný